Code of the West is a 1947 American Western film directed by William Berke and starring James Warren, Debra Alden, Steve Brodie and Robert Clarke. Written by Norman Houston, it is based on the novel of the same name by Zane Grey.

Plot
Two cowboys come to the aid of a rancher whose land is being threatened by an unscrupulous businessman.

Cast
 James Warren as Bob Wade
 Debra Alden as Ruth Stockton
 John Laurenz as Chito Rafferty
 Steve Brodie as Henchman Steve Saunders
 Rita Lynn as Pepita
 Robert Clarke as Harry Stockton
 Harry Woods as Marshal Nate Hatfield
 Carol Forman as Milly Saunders
 Raymond Burr as Boyd Carter
 Harry Harvey as Banker Henry Stockton
 Phil Warren as Henchman Wes
 Emmet Lynn as Doc Quinn

References

External links

1947 films
1947 Western (genre) films
Films based on works by Zane Grey
American Western (genre) films
American black-and-white films
Films directed by William A. Berke
RKO Pictures films
1940s English-language films
1940s American films